Teodora Pentcheva  (born 9 July 1982) is a Bulgarian snowboarder.
 
She competed in the 2003, 2005, 2007, 2009, 2011 and 2017 FIS Snowboard World Championships, and in the 2018 Winter Olympics, in parallel giant slalom.

References

External links

1982 births
Living people
Bulgarian female snowboarders 
Olympic snowboarders of Bulgaria 
Snowboarders at the 2018 Winter Olympics